Pradofloxacin (trade name Veraflox) is a 3rd generation enhanced spectrum veterinary antibiotic of the fluoroquinolone class. It was developed by Bayer HealthCare AG, Animal Health GmbH, and received approval from the European Commission in April 2011 for prescription-only use in veterinary medicine for the treatment of bacterial infections in dogs and cats.

History
Pradofloxacin was first discovered by chemists at Bayer in 1994 and patented in 1998. The name pradofloxacin was issued in December 2000 by the World Health Organization. Following submission for marketing authorisation to the European Medicines Agency (EMA) in 2004, the application was refused in 2006, prompting further studies.

Having reviewed the additional studies, the EMA Committee for Medicinal Products for Veterinary Use (CVMP) recommended granting marketing authorisation of pradofloxacin by consensus in February 2011. Marketing authorisation of pradofloxacin was granted by the European Commission in April 2011.

Mechanism of action
The primary mode of action of fluoroquinolones involves interaction with enzymes essential for major DNA functions such as replication, transcription and recombination. The primary targets for pradofloxacin are the bacterial DNA gyrase and topoisomerase IV enzymes. Reversible association between pradofloxacin and DNA gyrase or DNA topoisomerase IV in the target bacteria results in inhibition of these enzymes and rapid death of the bacterial cell. The rapidity and extent of bacterial killing are directly proportional to the drug concentration.

As a result, pradofloxacin is active against a wide range of Gram-positive and Gram-negative bacteria including anaerobic bacteria.

Indications
As with all prescription veterinary medicine, advice on the use of pradofloxacin should always be sought from a suitably qualified veterinarian.

Dogs
In Europe Pradofloxacin is indicated for the treatment of:

wound infections and superficial and deep pyoderma caused by susceptible strains of the Staphylococcus intermedius group (including S. pseudintermedius),
acute urinary tract infections caused by susceptible strains of Escherichia coli and the Staphylococcus intermedius group (including S. pseudintermedius) and
as adjunctive treatment to mechanical or surgical periodontal therapy in the treatment of severe infections of the gingiva and periodontal tissues caused by susceptible strains of anaerobic organisms, for example Porphyromonas spp. and Prevotella spp.

Cats
Pradofloxacin is indicated for the treatment of:

acute infections of the upper respiratory tract caused by susceptible strains of Pasteurella multocida, Escherichia coli and the Staphylococcus intermedius group (including S. pseudintermedius). 
wound infections and abscesses caused by susceptible strains of Pasteurella multocida and the Staphylococcus intermedius group (including S. pseudintermedius) [for oral suspension only].

See also
Quinolone

References

External links
 Summary of Product Characteristics

Fluoroquinolone antibiotics
Fluoroarenes
Nitriles
Pyrrolopyridines
Cyclopropanes
Carboxylic acids